Aayirathil Oruvan is a 2009 Malayalam-language drama film directed by Sibi Malayil, starring Kalabhavan Mani.

Plot 

Aravindan is an ever sacrificing brother who gets himself into a financial mess, following the marriage of his younger sister. As he strives hard to pay off the debt, he ends up borrowing even more and starts his slow and tragic descent into an abyss of no return.

Cast

Soundtrack 
The soundtrack of the film was composed by Mohan Sithara with lyrics by veteran poet and lyricist Yusuf Ali Kechery.

Reception 
Rediff.com gave the film 3.5 stars, saying "If not for anything else, you should see Aayirathil Oruvan if you are missing the old world charm in the movies these days". The Hindu wrote, "Though Ayirathil Oruvan, directed by Sibi Malayil, was in the can for four years, the movie scores a point for its story line and some brilliant performances".

References

External links 
 

2000s Malayalam-language films
2009 drama films
2009 films
Films directed by Sibi Malayil
Indian drama films